The 1981 Giro d'Italia was the 64th edition of the Giro d'Italia, one of cycling's Grand Tours. The Giro began in Trieste, with a prologue individual time trial on 13 May, and Stage 11 occurred on 26 May with a stage from Cascia. The race finished in Verona on 7 June.

Stage 11
26 May 1981 — Cascia to Arezzo,

Stage 12
27 May 1981 — Arezzo to Livorno Montenero,

Stage 13
28 May 1981 — Empoli to Montecatini Terme,  (ITT)

Stage 14
29 May 1981 — Montecatini Terme to Salsomaggiore Terme,

Stage 15
30 May 1981 — Salsomaggiore Terme to Pavia,

Stage 16
31 May 1981 — Milan to Mantua,

Stage 17
1 June 1981 — Mantua to Borno,

Stage 18
2 June 1981 — Borno to Dimaro,

Rest Day 3
3 June 1981

Stage 19
4 June 1981 — Dimaro to San Vigilio di Marebbe,

Stage 20
5 June 1981 — San Vigilio di Marebbe to Tre Cime di Lavaredo,

Stage 21
6 June 1981 — Auronzo di Cadore to Arzignano,

Stage 22
7 June 1981 — Soave to Verona,  (ITT)

References

1981 Giro d'Italia
Giro d'Italia stages